Al-Shams is the Arabic word for "the sun" and may refer to:

 Ash-Shams, the 91st Sura of the Quran
 Shamash, the Semitic Sun god
 Ain Shams University, a university located in Cairo, Egypt
 Majdal Shams, a Druze town in the Golan Heights (Migdal Shemesh in Hebrew)
 Al-Shams (newspaper), a Libyan newspaper in Arabic
 Al-Shams (East Pakistan), a paramilitary wing of several parties in East Pakistan abolished in 1971
 Shams Abu Dhabi, a real estate development on Al Reem Island, Abu Dhabi, United Arab Emirates

See also 
 Shams (disambiguation)